Vahap Işık (born 28 December 1982) is a Turkish former professional footballer who played as a centre back.

References

1982 births
Sportspeople from Giresun
Living people
Turkish footballers
Association football central defenders
Association football defenders
Ünyespor footballers
Gaskispor footballers
Gaziantep F.K. footballers
Antalyaspor footballers
Giresunspor footballers
Süper Lig players
TFF First League players
TFF Second League players